Mohammad Talaei (born April 7, 1973, in Isfahan) is an Iranian retired wrestler.

External links

1973 births
Living people
Olympic wrestlers of Iran
Wrestlers at the 1996 Summer Olympics
Wrestlers at the 2000 Summer Olympics
Iranian male sport wrestlers
Asian Games bronze medalists for Iran
Asian Games medalists in wrestling
Wrestlers at the 1998 Asian Games
World Wrestling Championships medalists
Medalists at the 1998 Asian Games
Sportspeople from Isfahan
20th-century Iranian people
21st-century Iranian people
World Wrestling Champions